John David Marks (November 10, 1909 – September 3, 1985) was an American songwriter. He specialized in Christmas songs (although he himself was Jewish and did not celebrate Christmas) and wrote many holiday standards, including "Rudolph the Red-Nosed Reindeer" (a hit for Gene Autry and others), "Rockin' Around the Christmas Tree" (a hit for Brenda Lee), "A Holly Jolly Christmas" (recorded by the Quinto Sisters and later by Burl Ives), "Silver and Gold" (for Burl Ives), and "I Heard the Bells on Christmas Day" (introduced by Bing Crosby). He is also credited with writing "Run Rudolph Run" (recorded by Chuck Berry) but this is due to his trademark of the Rudolph character, rather than any input in the writing of the song.

Personal life
Marks was born in Mount Vernon, New York. A graduate of McBurney School in New York, NY, and Colgate University and Columbia University, Marks later studied in Paris. He earned a Bronze Star and four Battle Stars as an Army Captain in the 26th Special Service Company during World War II. Marks had three children: Michael, Laura (d.2008) and David (d.2009). Marks, who was Jewish, was the great-uncle of economist Steven Levitt.

Marks was the nephew of Marcus M. Marks (1858–1934), a business figure who served as Borough President of Manhattan. Johnny Marks's father, Louis B. Marks, was a lighting engineer. His wife, Margaret May Marks, was the sister of Robert L. May who wrote the original story of Rudolph.

He lived on West 11th Street in Greenwich Village and is buried in Woodlawn Cemetery in The Bronx, New York City. He died on September 3, 1985, of complications from diabetes.

Career
Among Marks' many works is "Rudolph, the Red-Nosed Reindeer", which was based on a poem of the same name, written by Marks' brother-in-law, Robert L. May, Rudolph's creator.  A television film based on the story and song first aired in 1964, with Marks composing the score.

In addition to his songwriting, he founded St. Nicholas Music in 1949, and served as director of ASCAP from 1957 to 1961. In 1981, he was inducted into the Songwriters Hall of Fame.

Marks appeared as an imposter on the December 11, 1961 episode of the game show To Tell The Truth. Impersonating the owner of a herd of reindeer, he did receive two of the four votes. After the true contestant was revealed, Marks identified himself as the composer of "Rudolph the Red Nose Reindeer".

Works (incomplete list)

Christmas songs
Rudolph, the Red-Nosed Reindeer – 1949 (inspired by a poem by Robert L. May, Marks's brother-in-law)
I Don't Want a Lot for Christmas - 1950
When Santa Claus Gets Your Letter – 1952
The Night Before Christmas Song – 1952
An Old-Fashioned Christmas – 1952
Everyone's a Child at Christmas – 1956
I Heard the Bells on Christmas Day – 1956 (words by Henry Wadsworth Longfellow, adapted by Marks)
Run Rudolph Run - 1958 (words and music were written solely by Chuck Berry, Marks received the writing credit due to his trademark of the Rudolph character)
Rockin' Around the Christmas Tree – 1958
A Merry, Merry Christmas to You – 1959
The Santa Claus Parade – 1959
A Caroling We Go - 1966
Joyous Christmas - 1969

From the 1964 NBC/Rankin-Bass TV Production Rudolph, The Red-Nosed Reindeer
A Holly Jolly Christmas – 1965 (separate single release), 1964-65**
Jingle, Jingle, Jingle – 1964
The Most Wonderful Day of the Year – 1964
Silver and Gold – 1964-65**
We Are Santa's Elves – 1964
There's Always Tomorrow - 1964
The Island of Misfit Toys - 1964
We're a Couple of Misfits - 1964
** Burl Ives released "A Holly Jolly Christmas" and "Silver and Gold," two songs he sang as his character Sam the Snowman, as singles for the 1965 holiday season, the year after the TV production.

From the 1975 DePatie-Freling TV Production The Tiny Tree
To Love And Be Loved - 1975
When Autumn Comes - 1975
Tell It to a Turtle - 1975
A Caroling We Go - 1966
A Merry Merry Christmas To You - 1959
Joyous Christmas - 1969

From the 1976 ABC/Rankin-Bass TV Production Rudolph's Shiny New Year
The Moving Finger Writes – 1976
Turn Back The Years – 1976
It's Raining Sunshine – 1976
What A Wonderful World We Live In - 1976
Fourth Of July Parade - 1976
Have A Little Faith In Me - 1976
Have a Happy New Year - 1976

Other
Happy New Year Darling – 1946 (with J. Carmen Lombardo)
Address Unknown
Chicken Today and Feathers Tomorrow
Don't Cross Your Fingers, Cross Your Heart
Free
How Long Is Forever?
I Guess There's an End to Everything
Neglected
She'll Always Remember
Summer Holiday
We Speak of You Often
What've You Got to Lose But Your Heart
Who Calls?

References

External links

Interview with Johnny Marks in International Songwriters Association's "Songwriter Magazine"

1909 births
1985 deaths
American lyricists
Animation composers
Jewish American songwriters
Songwriters from New York (state)
20th-century American musicians
Colgate University alumni
Columbia University alumni
McBurney School alumni
Deaths from diabetes
20th-century American Jews
United States Army personnel of World War II
United States Army officers